Ana Ruiz Mitxelena (2 September 1967 – 29 November 1993) was a Spanish football goalkeeper.

As an international (the first player from Gipuzkoa province and the first goalkeeper from the Basque region to be selected) she featured for the Spain women's national  football team (1984 to 1988) and the Spain women's national futsal team.

She died in a road accident aged 26.

References

1967 births
Spanish women's footballers
1993 deaths
Spain women's international footballers
Footballers from San Sebastián
Oiartzun KE players
Women's association football goalkeepers
Spanish women's futsal players
Road incident deaths in Spain
20th-century Spanish women